Bannaby is a locality in the Southern Tablelands of New South Wales, Australia in Upper Lachlan Shire. It is located near the township of Taralga, on the Bannaby road.

The locality consists of an Anglican Church and some woolsheds.

Tarlo River National Park rises in the southern part of Bannaby, while the Blue Mountains National Park and Wombeyan Caves are located about 5 kilometres to the north.

The locality is roughly equivalent to the cadastral parish of Bannaby in the County of Argyle.

Heritage listings
Bannaby has a number of heritage-listed sites, including:
 Hillas Farm Homestead

References 

Upper Lachlan Shire
Towns in New South Wales
Southern Tablelands